South Cotabato (Maguindanaon: Pagabagatan Kutawatu, Jawi: ڤاڬابڬتن كوتاواتو), officially the Province of South Cotabato, is a province in the Philippines located in the Soccsksargen region in Mindanao. Its capital is Koronadal, and it borders Sultan Kudarat to the north and west, Sarangani to the south and northeast, and Davao del Sur to the far northeast. To the southeast lies Sarangani Bay.

General Santos, located on the shores of Sarangani Bay, is the most populous city in both the province and the region, but is governed independently from the province. The province of Sarangani used to be part of South Cotabato until it was made an independent province in 1992.

History
Centuries ago, the area that would be the South Cotabato was sparsely inhabited by Maguindanaon pioneers and Lumads which are under Sultanate of Maguindanao's influence. The Spaniards launched expeditions to subdue the area throughout the colonial era but they never gained control of the region until the middle of the 19th century after the Spaniards established a military post at what is now Barangay Tamontaka, one of the earliest Christian settlements founded south of the Philippines, in present-day Cotabato City. Spaniards already took with them Chavacano-speaking Christians and Muslims from Zamboanga and Basilan, as well as the Visayans, especially the Hiligaynons and Cebuanos.

The area of what is now South Cotabato and Sarangani provinces used to be part of Davao province until 1914, when the reorganization of the districts in Mindanao took place, thus it became part of the then-undivided Cotabato province. Settlers, who would lay the foundation of what would become a progressive province, started trooping down 1914.

The significant thrust occurred during the term of President Quezon in late 1930s. General Paulino Santos led the first of wave of settlers that time. After World War II, the final exodus of settlers from Luzon and Visayas poured into the area's virgin land.

In the early 1960s as population, trade and industries grew in southern part of Cotabato, a clamor of local self-governance arose. Thus, on July 18, 1966, South Cotabato was separated from Cotabato as an independent province. At that time, the province consisted of 11 municipalities, namely: Banga, South Cotabato, General Santos (now a city), Glan, Kiamba, Koronadal, Maitum, Norala, Polomolok, Surallah, Tantangan, and Tupi. These municipalities were established long before the creation of the province. Other component municipalities were formed after it fully functioned as a province.

With the creation of regions under Pres. Ferdinand Marcos, South Cotabato was grouped with Region XI, also known as Southern Mindanao, in 1975.

In 1992, the province of Sarangani was formed out of South Cotabato. Seven towns in southern and coastal section of the province (Malungon, Alabel, Malapatan, Glan, Maasim, Kiamba and Maitum) became part of the new province, leaving South Cotabato with 11 remaining municipalities.

Regional offices were relocated to South Cotabato in accordance with EO 429 dated October 12, 1990, issued by President Corazon C. Aquino during the expansion of the newly created Autonomous Region in Muslim Mindanao, and EO No. 36 dated September 19, 2001, issued by President Gloria Macapagal Arroyo which says South Cotabato is to be transferred from Southern Mindanao region to Region XII and having the city of Koronadal as the regional center of Region XII.

On August 16, 2000, Republic Act No. 8803 was approved, that converted the municipality of Koronadal into a component city of South Cotabato.

In 2015, the National Competitiveness Council declared the province as the 4th most competitive province in the country.

Geography
The province is situated on the southern section of central Mindanao, bounded by the provinces of Sultan Kudarat to the north and west, Sarangani to the south and northeast, Davao del Sur to the far northeast, and the Sarangani Bay to the southeast.

The province is generally flat dotted with some hills and mountains.

Climate
South Cotabato belongs to the fourth type of climate, that is rainfall is more or less evenly distributed throughout the year. The average number of rainy days for the year 2004 is recorded between 122 and 180 days with the months of May, June, July, August and October having the most occurrence.

Air humidity generally follows closely the rainfall pattern. Humidity is highest during the period of June to October with 88% being recorded at the Tupi seed farm. The months of February and April have the lowest air humidity recorded at about 72%.

The hottest period is January to April while July to December being the coolest.

South Cotabato enjoys a mild, pleasant climate with no pronounced dry or wet season, and is practically typhoon-free.

Administrative divisions
South Cotabato comprises 10 municipalities and 1 component city. The highly urbanized city of General Santos is traditionally grouped with, but administered independently from the province. There are 225 barangays (including the city of Koronadal).

Demographics

The population of South Cotabato (excluding General Santos) was 975,476 in the 2020 census, making it one of the country's most populous province.

Inhabitants
The people of South Cotabato have diverse heritages. Ethnic Hiligaynons, descendants of migrants from Panay and Negros in the Visayas who settled in the municipalities/towns of Norala, Banga, Surallah, Santo Niño and the province's capital city, Koronadal, are the majority in the province. The province's major media of communication are Hiligaynon, Tagalog, and English. On the other hand, Ilocano-speaking peoples of Luzon settled in Tampakan, Tantangan and Tupi, and the Ilocano language may still be heard in these towns. The Cebuanos are the main ethnic group of the municipality of Polomolok, and are one of the main ethnic groups of Tupi (along with the Hiligaynons and Kapampangans). Both towns are near to General Santos, which speaks both Hiligaynon and Cebuano. Chavacano speakers are even found scattered in some areas of the province, as well as Maguindanaons because of the province's history of being part of Sultanate of Maguindanao. Tbolis mainly reside around the Lake Sebu area, while Blaans reside within General Santos and its outskirts.

Religion

Roman Catholics predominate the province with 65% adherence, while Islam is a minority religion which is 6% of the population. Other minorities are various Christian Churches such as Prostestants which form about 22% and consist of mostly evangelicals of the province's population which can be mostly found in some urban parts of the province. Iglesia ni Cristo forms about 3-4% population. The remainder are divided among Buddhist and animism.

The Maguindanao tribe is the major Muslim Filipino tribe in the province. Other indigenous Filipino tribes are the T'boli and B'laan tribes in Lake Sebu and T'boli municipalities, famous for their brassworks, beadwork and t'nalak weave. The people of these tribes wear colorful embroidered native costumes and beadwork accessories. The women of these tribes, particularly, wear heavy brass belts with brass 'tassels' ending in tiny brass bells that herald their approach even when they are a long way off.

The people of South Cotabato retain many of the practices and traditions of their particular tribal heritages, although infused with a flavor that is distinctly Mindanaoan and the product of cultural interaction between the immigrants and the indigenous peoples of the area. One vivid example of this is the predominant use of the native malong, the colorful, tubelike garment used as a skirt by the indigenous tribes, in place of a blanket or sleeping bag.

Language
Hiligaynon is the most widely spoken language in the province. It is the main language in the capital city of Koronadal and the municipalities of the Upper Valley region, namely, Surallah, Banga, Norala, Sto. Niño and Tantangan, followed by Cebuano, which is the majority language of General Santosand the main language in the Municipalities of Polomolok, Tampakan and Tupi. Tagalog and English are widely understood and often used for administrative functions by the local government and in education, with the former serving as dominant language in local media and of everyday communication of speakers of different languages. Other languages spoken in the province are Tboli, Blaan, Maguindanaon, and Ilocano.

Economy

Government
Executive Branch:
Governor: Reynaldo S. Tamayo Jr. 
 Vice Governor: Vicente  R. De Jesus

Legislative Branch:

Sangguniang Panlalawigan (Provincial Board Members)
First District:
 SP Glycel D. Mariano-Trabado
SP Eamon Gabriel V. Matti
SP Noel J. Escobillo

Second District:
 SP Ester Marin-Catorce
SP Dardanilo N. Dar
SP Ellen Grace Subere-Albios
SP Jinky P. Avance
SP Hilario G. De Pedro IV
SP Antonio B. Fungan
SP Henry L. Ladot

Ex-Officio Members:
 SP Allysa L. Marie Fale, SK President
 SP Rose Grace J. Achurra, PCL President 
 SP Edgar  G. Sambog, IPMR
 SP Rolando D. Malabuyoc, LnB President

Provincial capital
The Local Provincial Government holds its official functions in the City of Koronadal. The Provincial Capitol, Provincial Hospital, and all related offices are found in the city.

Legislative districts

 1st District Representative: Shirlyn Bañas-Nograles
 2nd District Representative: Ferdinand L. Hernandez
 Lone District of General Santos: (To be elected on 2022 Presidential Elections)

House Bill No. 4678, filed on December 13, 2016, by First District Rep. Pedro B. Acharon, Jr., seeks to segregate the highly urbanized city of General Santos from the said district to form its own congressional district, separate from the representation of South Cotabato. This bill was signed by the president last March 11, 2019.

List of governors of South Cotabato since 1967

1967 - 1986:  Dr. Sergio B. Morales (First Governor of South Cotabato)
1986 - 1992:  Ismael Sueno (Former Koronadal Mayor)
1992 - 2001:  Hilario De Pedro III (Former Koronadal Mayor and Congressman)
2001 - 2010:  Daisy P. Avance - Fuentes (Former Congresswoman)
2010 - 2013:  Arthur Y. Pingoy, MD (Former Congressman)
2013 - 2019:  Daisy P. Avance - Fuentes (Former Congresswoman and Governor)
2019–Present:  Reynaldo Tamayo Jr. (Former Tupi Mayor)

Musical heritage

The native Maguindanaon of South Cotabato have a culture that revolves around kulintang music, a specific type of gong music, found among both Muslim and non-Muslim groups of the Southern Philippines.

Festivals of South Cotabato

Province wide:
T'nalak Festival - July 9–18 (South Cotabato Foundation Anniversary) 

City/Municipalities' festivals:
Koronadal City - Hinugyaw Festival (January 10), Cityhood Anniversary (October 8)
Banga - Pasundayag Festival (March 1 Week)
Lake Sebu - Helobung Festival (November 9–11)
Norala - Kamayadan Festival (March 10)
Polomolok - FlomLok Festival (September 10), Pinyahan Festival (Brgy. Cannery Site, Polomolok)
Sto. Nino - Hinublag Festival (2nd Week of December)
Surallah - SurbeTube Festival (2nd Week of June )
T'boli - Seslong Festival (2nd Week of March)
Tampakan - Tamfaken Lum Alay Festival (June 25)
Tantangan - Kulitangtang Festival (January 27)
Tupi - Agfen Tufi Festival (September 1)

Education
There are numerous Higher Educational Institutions in South Cotabato, mostly located Koronadal City.
 Notre Dame of Marbel University, Koronadal 
 University of the Philippines Manila School of Health Sciences, Koronadal campus
 South Cotabato State College, Surallah, South Cotabato
St. Alexis College, Koronadal City 
Ramon Magsaysay Memorial College, Koronadal City  
Green Valley College Foundation, Koronadal City
STI College Koronadal, Koronadal City
King's College of Marbel, Inc., Koronadal City
Notre Dame — Siena College of Polomolok, Polomolok
Regency Polytechnic College, Koronadal City
Goldenstate College Marbel, Koronadal City
Marvelous College of Technology, Inc., Koronadal City
ACLC College of Marbel, Koronadal City
South East Asian Institute of Technology, Municipality of Tupi

Notable people, Koronadal

 Kenneth Duremdes, professional basketball player
 Manny Pacquiao, professional boxer and senator
 Gerald Anderson, actor, triathlete and Pinoy Big Brother Teen Edition 3rd Teen Placer
 Melai Cantiveros-Francisco, comedian, actress, host, Pinoy Big Brother Double Up Big Winner and Your Face Sounds Familiar Grand Winner
 Orlando Quevedo, cardinal and archbishop of Cotabato
 Shamcey Supsup,  actress, architect and Miss Universe 2011 3rd Runner Up
 Eduardo Buenavista, Filipino long-distance runner and two-time Olympian
 Ismael Sueno, Former Secretary of DILG during Incumbent President Duterte Administration (2016-2017)
 Cesar "Saro" Bañares, Jr., member of folk rock band Asin

Sister province
 Cebu Province

References

External links

 
 

 
Provinces of the Philippines
Provinces of Soccsksargen
States and territories established in 1966
1966 establishments in the Philippines